House By the Lake is an American horror film directed by Adam Gierasch and written by Josh Burnell. The film stars James Callis, Anne Dudek, Michael Bowen, and Amiah Miller. It was released on October 10, 2017.

Cast 
 James Callis as Scott
 Anne Dudek as Karen
 Michael Bowen as Harry
 Amiah Miller as Emma
 Natasha Bassett as Gwen
 Lee Garlington as Dr. Llewelyn

Production 
In August 2015, it was announced that principal photography on the film had begun in Big Bear Lake, California. The film was being directed by Adam Gierasch, based on the script by Josh Burnell. The film would star James Callis, Anne Dudek, Michael Bowen, and Amiah Miller. Mike De Trana would produce the film through Anvil Entertainment along with Gary King and Jace Anderson.

References

External links 
 

2017 films
American horror films
Films shot in California
Films directed by Adam Gierasch
2010s English-language films
2010s American films
2017 horror films